Yijing (635–713CE), formerly romanized as  or , born Zhang Wenming, was a Tang-era Chinese Buddhist monk famed as a traveller and translator. His account of his travels is an important source for the history of the medieval kingdoms along the sea route between China and India, especially Srivijaya in Indonesia. A student of the Buddhist university at Nālandā (now in Bihar, India), he was also responsible for the translation of many Buddhist texts from Sanskrit and Pali into Chinese.

Journey

To Srivijaya and Nālandā
Yijing was born . He became a monk at age 14 and was an admirer of Faxian, a famed monk who traveled to India in the 4th and 5th centuries CE. Provided funding by an otherwise unknown benefactor named Fong, he decided to visit the renowned Buddhist university of Nālandā, in Bihar, India, to further study Buddhism. Traveling by a  boat out of Guangzhou, he arrived in Srivijaya (today's Palembang of Sumatra) after 22 days, where he spent the next six months learning Sanskrit grammar and the Malay language. He went on to record visits to the nations of Malayu and Kiteh (Kedah). 

In 673 after ten days of additional travel reached the "naked kingdom" (south west of Shu). Yijing recorded his impression of the "Kunlun peoples", using an ancient Chinese word for Malay peoples. "Kunlun people have curly hair, dark bodies, bare feet and wear sarongs." He then arrived at the East coast of India, where he met a senior monk and stayed a year to study Sanskrit. Both later followed a group of merchants and visited 30 other principalities. Halfway to Nālandā, Yijing fell sick and was unable to walk. Gradually he was left behind by the group. He walked to Nālandā where he stayed for 11 years.

Returning to Srivijaya
In 687, Yijing stopped in the kingdom of Srivijaya on his way back to Tang China. At that time, Palembang was a centre of Buddhism where foreign scholars gathered, and Yijing stayed there for two years to translate original Sanskrit Buddhist scriptures into Chinese. In the year 689 he returned to Guangzhou to obtain ink and papers (note: Srivijaya then had no paper and ink) and returned again to Srivijaya the same year.

Return to China
In 695, he completed all translation works and finally returned to China at Luoyang and received a grand welcome back by Empress Wu Zetian. His total journey took 25 years. He brought back some 400 Buddhist texts translated into Chinese. 

The Account of Buddhism sent from the South Seas and Buddhist Monk's Pilgrimage of the Tang Dynasty are two of Yijing's best travel diaries, describing his adventurous journey to Srivijaya and India, reporting on the society of India, the lifestyles of various local peoples, and more.

Distribution of Buddhist traditions
In the great majority of areas in India, Yijing writes that there were followers of both "vehicles" (Skt. Yana), with some Buddhists practicing according to the "Hinayana" and others practicing according to the Mahayana. However, he describes Northern India and most of the islands of the South Seas (i.e. Sumatra, Java, etc.) as principally "Hīnayāna." In contrast, the Buddhists in China and Malayu are described as principally following the Mahāyāna.

Yijing wrote about relationship between the various "vehicles" and the early Buddhist schools in India. He wrote, "There exist in the West numerous subdivisions of the schools which have different origins, but there are only four principal schools of continuous tradition." These schools are namely the Mahāsāṃghika, Sthavira, Mulasarvastivada, and Saṃmitīya nikāyas. Explaining their doctrinal affiliations, he then writes, "Which of the four schools should be grouped with the Mahāyāna or with the Hīnayāna is not determined." That is to say, there was no simple correspondence between a monastic sect and whether its members learned "Hīnayāna" or "Mahāyāna" teachings.

Buddhism in Srivijaya

Yijing praised the high level of Buddhist scholarship in Srivijaya (modern-day Sumatra) and advised Chinese monks to study there prior to making the journey to Nalanda in India.

Yijing's visits to Srivijaya gave him the opportunity to meet with others who had come from other neighboring islands. According to him, the Javanese kingdom of Ho-ling (Kalingga Kingdom) was due east of the city of Bhoga at a distance that could be spanned by a four or five days' journey by sea. He also wrote that Buddhism was flourishing throughout the islands of Southeast Asia. "Many of the kings and chieftains in the islands of the Southern Sea admire and believe in Buddhism, and their hearts are set on accumulating good actions."

Translations into Chinese
Yijing translated more than 60 texts into Chinese, including:
 Mūlasarvāstivāda Vinaya
 Golden Light Sutra in 703
 Diamond Sutra (T. 239) in 703
 Sūtra of the Original Vows of the Medicine Buddha of Lapis Lazuli Radiance and the Seven Past Buddhas (T. 451), in 707
 Avadanas in 710

See also

 Faxian
 Chinese Buddhism
 A Record of Buddhist Practices Sent Home from the Southern Sea
 Song Yun
 Xuanzang
 Vikramashila
 Hyecho
 Great Tang Records on the Western Regions
 Wang ocheonchukguk jeon

References

Citations

Sources 

 Dutt S, Buddhist Monks and Monasteries of India, with the translation of passages (given by Latika Lahiri to S. Dutt, see note 2 p. 311) from Yijing's book: Buddhist Pilgrim Monks of Tang Dynasty as an appendix.  London, 1952
 I-Tsing, A Record of the Buddhist Religion : As Practised in India and the Malay Archipelago (A.D. 671-695), Translated by J. Takakusu, Clarendon press 1896. Reprint. New Delhi, AES, 2005, . Internet Archive
 I-Tsing, Chinese Monks in India, Biography of Eminent Monks Who Went to the Western World in Search of the Law During the Great tang Dynasty, Translated by Latika Lahiri, Delhi, etc.: Motilal Banarsidass, 1986
 Sen, T. (2006). The Travel Records of Chinese Pilgrims Faxian, Xuanzang, and Yijing, Education About Asia 11 (3), 24-33
 Weerawardane, Prasani (2009). Journey to the West: Dusty Roads, Stormy Seas and Transcendence, biblioasia 5 (2), 14-18
 Yijing, Rongxi, Li, transl. (2000). A Record of the Inner Law Sent Home from the South Seas(pdf available on the page), Berkeley CA: Bukkyo Dendo Kyokai. .

External links
 http://www.buddhanet.net/bodh_gaya/bodh_gaya01.htm
 http://www.iranchamber.com/culture/articles/iranian_cultural_impact_southeastasia.php

635 births
713 deaths
Chinese scholars of Buddhism
7th-century Buddhist monks
8th-century Buddhist monks
Tang dynasty translators
Monks of Nalanda
History of Malaysia
Sanskrit–Chinese translators
Tang dynasty Buddhist monks
Pilgrimage accounts
Writers from Jinan
Chinese spiritual writers
Explorers of India
7th-century Chinese translators
Srivijaya